István Nagy (born 28 April 1959 in Heves) is a retired  100 and 200 metres runner from Hungary. He won the Hungarian outdoor championships 7 times, he also won the Hungarian Indoor championships at 60/200 metres on 6 occasions also.

He competed at the 1980 Moscow Games in the 100/200 metres but did not make it past the Quarter finals in either sprint.

In 1981 he won a silver medal at the World Students 200 metres final.

He competed at the 1982 European championships in the 200 metres, where he finished 5th in the final.

He won two medals at the European Indoor Championships.

Achievements

External links

sports-reference

1959 births
Living people
Hungarian male sprinters
Olympic athletes of Hungary
Athletes (track and field) at the 1980 Summer Olympics
Universiade medalists in athletics (track and field)
Universiade silver medalists for Hungary
Medalists at the 1981 Summer Universiade
People from Heves
Sportspeople from Heves County